Captain Shane Michael Schofield, callsign Scarecrow, United States Marine Corps, is a fictional character, whose exploits form the basis of a series created by the Australian author Matthew Reilly. He appears in Ice Station (1998), Area 7 (2001), Scarecrow (2003), The Four Legendary Kingdoms (2016; cameo appearance), and the spin-off Hell Island (2005). While the plot differs from novel to novel, it is mainly based around Schofield's legendary reputation as a strong Marine, revered by the Marines that serve under his command, and is known for his high-risk tactical manoeuvres.

The role was voiced by Australian actor Joshua Mensch in the Ice Station live shows and audio drama at the Adelaide Fringe Festival.

Biography 

Schofield's callsign "Scarecrow" refers to the vertical scars running over each of his eyes. They were inflicted upon him in 1995 when he was tortured in Serbia during the Yugoslav Wars after his Harrier aircraft was shot down. A Marine Force Reconnaissance unit was sent in, one of its members being Buck "Book" Riley, who later joins Schofield's team in Ice Station. Schofield withstood hours of torture, never revealing his mission, before the Serbs technically blinded him, believing (correctly) that he was helping Navy SEALs that were killing Serbian soldiers. At Johns Hopkins University Hospital, they fixed his eyesight, yet the scars remained, leaving him to cover them with silver, wrap-around, anti-flash sunglasses for the future. Due to military regulations, Schofield was never allowed to fly a military plane again. He then decided to become a ground soldier and returned to Basic School in Quantico, Virginia. A few months later, Schofield was promoted and was eventually given his own Recon unit. He was given command of the unit approximately two years before the events in Ice Station. In Ice Station he holds the rank of lieutenant, and from Area 7 onward he is a captain.

During the events of Scarecrow and the Army of Thieves, more details of his family life were revealed. His grandfather, Michael Schofield (callsign "Mustang") was one of the most decorated Marines in the Corps. While Schofield is close to his grandfather, his relationship with his father, John Schofield, is considerably worse. John Schofield resented Michael's standing within the Corps, and despite being a successful businessman, he felt he was unable to step out from his father's shadow. This manifested in a pattern of systematic abuse against his wife and son. John Schofield ultimately committed suicide, leaving twelve million dollars to his son; Shane Schofield donated all of it to a Washington, D.C., hospital, as he felt the money was tainted.

Appearances

Ice Station 

In Ice Station, Schofield and Marine Reconnaissance Unit 16 were sent to answer a distress signal from the isolated Wilkes American research station in Antarctica, from which they claim to have discovered an alien spaceship buried under the ice before the divers sent to investigate it were killed. Schofield's team finds more than they bargained for when they are attacked by a French paratrooper unit, which disguised itself as a group of scientists from a nearby French station in order to gain the Wilke's station's scientists' trust. After narrowly defeating them, Schofield blames himself for not seeing them as soldiers. After a lucky victory, Schofield sends some of his forces and a scientist down to the cavern to investigate the spacecraft. Following the murder of one of his heavily wounded men, Schofield begins to worry that one of his men is a traitor, remembering a distress transmission he received from a fellow Marine, Andrew Trent, years before when Trent claimed that some of his unit's men had turned against the rest. Admitting these fears to Gena 'Mother' Newman, he realises that a scientist named James Renshaw who had apparently killed another scientist before their arrival might be the culprit, but Schofield is promptly shot in the neck while awaiting Renshaw's status and location in the station, his heart stopping.

However, Schofield's would-be assassin kicked his body into the diving pool, unknowingly kick-starting his heart, with the icy water acting as an inadvertent defibrillator. The unconscious Schofield was retrieved by Renshaw, who helped clear up the wound, noting Schofield had been lucky that he had been wearing a hidden kevlar collar where he had been shot, and asked for help in proving his innocence. After confronting the Marine who had shot him, Scott 'Snake' Kaplan, and preventing him from killing Mother, he learned that the Intelligence Convergence Group (ICG), a secretive and insidious government intelligence organisation dedicated to maintaining America's technological superiority at any cost, was preparing to seize the spacecraft and kill Schofield and his team to prevent them from spreading word about the spacecraft. Simultaneously, they learn that a team from the British Special Air Service was on its way, led by Brigadier Trevor Barnby, a former mentor intent on securing the secret of Wilkes Ice Station for the British; consequently, Schofield orders his heavily depleted team to evacuate. But en route to McMurdo station, Schofield and Renshaw's hovercraft went over the ice cliff and into the ocean below, where Schofield destroyed a French submarine intending to destroy Wilkes.

Finding diving equipment in what had once been another ice station before it had disappeared in an iceberg, Schofield and Renshaw made their way back to Wilkes and confronted the SAS team, killing every single member. After receiving a message from the still-alive Trent, Schofield learned the names of several ICG members, proceeding to escape into the ice cavern to avoid being attacked by the Naval Special Forces unit of the US military unit: Navy SEALs. Having learned the spacecraft was actually a long-lost prototype military aircraft called the Silhouette, and that a nuclear missile is set to destroy the Wilkes station, Schofield and the remaining survivors manage to activate the ship, and Schofield narrowly manages to pilot it out. After engaging in a dogfight with a squadron of F-22 Raptors under the control of the ICG, Schofield lands on a USMC aircraft carrier titled "Wasp", using the Silhouette's last missile to destroy the plane.

After arriving in Pearl Harbor, Schofield is confronted by Sergeant-Major Chuck Kozlowski, one of the heads of ICG, who prepares to kill him, but is saved by Trent's intervention. After exposing the ICG, Schofield sits near the bed of the wounded Elizabeth Gant, refusing to leave her side until she wakes up.

Area 7 
Area 7 happens following the fallout from the Wilkes Ice Station incident. Schofield, Mother and Gant have been reassigned to Presidential Detail, stationed on Marine One, in order to keep them out of the public's eye since Schofield is still popular from the ICG / Wilkes Station situation. He has gone out on a date with Gant earlier, which ended somewhat awkwardly due to Schofield's fear that Gant wouldn't want him because of his eyes and his decision not to kiss her at the conclusion of their date. While paying a routine visit to a top secret Air Force Base, known as Area 7 in the Utah desert, Schofield begins to suspect something is wrong, and is called upon to act as bodyguard for the President when the staff's Air Force personnel, 7th Squadron, led by Charles 'Caesar' Russell, issues a challenge; if the President's heart stops, fourteen major American cities will be destroyed, due to a device connected to the President's heart. After avoiding being killed in the initial attack, Schofield leads a group through the base to locate the President, destroying an AWACs plane and finding a boy named Kevin contained in the facility. Soon his team find the President and briefly drive away some of the 7th Squadron soldiers.

After learning the base is a research facility to counteract a fictional Chinese-developed virus, called the Sinovirus, which could kill anyone with a specific set of pigmentation cells and that Kevin is being used to develop a cure, Schofield manages to procure the Football for the President so that the warheads won't be detonated at the end of a recurring 90-minute countdown. However Kevin has been taken by a team of South African Reccondos and the turncoat/scientist Gunther Botha,. Schofield goes to rescue him, but they are intercepted and attacked by 7th Squadron soldiers and are separated from the President, with Schofield in possession of the Football. Arriving at Lake Powell, Schofield and Book II survive a brawl and hide underwater while the Reccondos and Botha are killed and the 7th Squadron forces seize Kevin. While making their way back to Area 7 to get the Football to the President, Schofield tells Book II about his father's death by Barnaby's hands during Ice Station, earning the young Marine's respect. After finding the President and restarting the Football's countdown, Schofield and the others are captured by the escaped prisoners of the facility, and kill some of the 7th Squadron soldiers they are forced to fight. Although Colonel Harper unleashes a Sinovirus grenade in an attempt to kill everyone else, Schofield uses the vaccine that Botha possessed to vaccinate himself and his team.

Schofield then pursues Caesar and the 7th Squadron's Echo unit to Area 8, where the Echo unit is planning to use an X-38 to take Kevin to a Chinese space station. En route, Mother confronts him on not kissing Gant earlier, admitting he is afraid of Gant's thoughts about his eyes, and Mother reassures him about Gant's feelings. At Area 8, Schofield and the President manage to sneak aboard the 747 plane carrying the X-38 and then get on board that in turn. As they head into space, they retrieve Kevin and force the pilot to return to Area 7, where Caesar reveals he also possesses a transmitter on his heart, preparing to kill himself so that he will in some way succeed. Schofield rescues Gant from the remaining prisoner, Lucifer Leary, who is about to kill her, and kisses her at last. They then go to stop Caesar and stop the self-destruct sequence, however Caesar stops him. After narrowly defeating the leader of the 7th Squadron, Kurt Logan, Schofield is able to kill Caesar once Gant disrupts his transmitter, and the two escape the self-destructing facility. Later, after being awarded medals for saving the President's life, Schofield and Gant go on another date.

Scarecrow 

Taking place eighteen months later, Scarecrow has Schofield now dating Gant, forcing them to work in different units due to military protocol, and preparing to propose when they go on a holiday in Italy. After a mission to a former Soviet base turns out to be a sham, Schofield learns he is one of fifteen names on an international bounty hunt list, with each head valued at $18.6 million. Narrowly escaping ExSol and leader Cedric Wexley, Schofield races to find Gant to prevent anyone from using her to get to him. However he is too late, and another bounty hunting team, IG-88, captures her. Luckily another bounty hunter, Aloysius Knight otherwise known as 'The Black Knight', helps him to rescue Gant, having been paid by Lillian Mattencourt to keep him alive until the end of the bounty. After rescuing Gant, they follow a lead to the Forteresse de Valois, a castle in France where bounties are being paid off.

While waiting in disguise for Knight to gather information, Jonathon Killian (who is the castle's owner) appears pleasant to Schofield and Gant, but he has actually discovered Schofield's true identity and leaves him to the ExSol forces and another bounty-hunting group, the Skorpions. After a lengthy and highly destructive chase, Schofield is forced to parachute into the ocean while Knight and Gant are captured and taken back to Forteresse de Valois. Before being taken aboard a French aircraft carrier, Book II informs Schofield that Killian and the Majestic-12, the richest men in the world, are eliminating the people on the list because they are the only ones who can disarm a CincLock-VII security system, which will launch missiles at major locations and start a new Cold War. Afterwards, the French (who have not forgotten about Schofield's defeat of the French Paratroopers and submarine at Wilkes Station) use him to disarm a CincLock-VII device and prepare to kill him, but Mother, Knight and Rufus save him just in time. However, they inform him that Gant has been murdered.

The distraught Schofield attempts suicide, but Mother stops him and convinces him not to kill himself and to stop M-12's plans. After stopping all CincLock-VII systems, Schofield discovers Killian has his own plan, to create anarchy by using another missile to blow up Mecca. Using an X-15 to catch up to the missile, Schofield disarms it, but is forced to crash, after which they are apprehended and taken back to the Forteresse de Valois. Killian orders Cal Noonan, who killed Gant with a guillotine, to do the same to Schofield. Luckily Mother arrives, and Schofield kills Noonan and Wexley in the ensuing battle. After confronting Killian, Schofield takes Killian with him as he jumps out the window to kill them both, but Knight rescues him with his maghook. After a few weeks, Schofield receives a letter from Knight encouraging him to move on with his life and accept Gant's death, and Schofield decides to return to duty.

Hell Island 

In Hell Island, Schofield is re-equipped with a new team of Force Recon Marines. On a mission to a base which conducts scientific experiments and apparently attacked on Hell Island, Schofield's Marines, as well as a Delta Force team, a squad of SEALs and a force from the 82nd Airborne Division, prepare to investigate. Landing on an aircraft carrier, Schofield team are the only survivors of the groups that landed on the carrier after being attacked by gorillas, enhanced with a chip (nanotechnology) within their brains to turn them into soldiers. Defeating a large number of the gorillas by luring them into a helicopter and ditching it into the ocean, the Marines try to come up with a plan, during which Schofield realises the gorillas are being controlled by William Buck "Buccaneer" Broyles, the former leader of what was acknowledged to be the best Marines Unit.

Using knowledge gained from his grandfather, Michael Schofield, who was one of many Marines who seized the island during World War II, he leads his men into an old munitions chamber where the gorillas are trapped and set to be killed in an explosion. However, Dr Malcolm Knox, the DARPA scientist in charge of the project, stops them and apparently congratulates Schofield on his success for his unknowing participation in the test. But Knox orders the Delta team to execute them. However, Mother jams the signals controlling the chips in the apes, releasing them to murder the scientists while Schofield and his men kill the Delta team. Schofield floods the tunnels and drowns the gorillas along with the "Buccaneer". They leave on a C-17 which was sent to pick up the DARPA scientists and Delta teams along with the apes.

Scarecrow and the Army of Thieves 

Despite being cleared for active duty at the end of Scarecrow, Schofield is considered to be a liability by the Corps, a 'broken' Marine, and becomes a teacher at Parris Island. The position is considered to be an insult to a Marine of Schofield's standing, but he finds he enjoys teaching, and many of his students respect him. However, his situation is complicated by an outstanding bounty on his head. Although the members of the Majestic-12 conspiracy are all dead, the French government has offered to pay the $18.6 million bounty to anyone who can capture or kill him. After surviving several assassination attempts, Schofield is assigned to a long-term equipment testing project with a handful of Marines and civilian contractors. He and his unit are stationed in the Arctic when the Army of Thieves takes control of the Dragon Island weapons facility, which was once the crown jewel in the Soviet weapons development program.

Schofield and his team infiltrate the weapons depot, aiming to disarm a "Tesla weapon", an experimental device that, when fired, will ignite the atmosphere and trigger a firestorm that could annihilate the Northern Hemisphere. Along the way, they encounter Veronique Champion, an assassin working for the French Directorate-General for External Security seeking to kill Schofield as an enemy of France. Unaware of the threat posed by the Army of Thieves, Champion agrees to help him, but promises to kill him once the threat is over.

A recurring subplot throughout the story deals with Schofield's psychological state following the murder of Elizabeth Gant. After seeing a civilian psychiatrist, he accepts that he will never get closure over Gant's death, but by compartmentalising his memories of her, he will be able to continue being a soldier. This ability becomes crucial in enduring torture at the hands of Marius Calderon, the leader of the Army of Thieves.

The Four Legendary Kingdoms
When Reilly's other recurring protagonist, Jack West Jr, is abducted and forced to participate in the Hydra Games, a contest of sixteen champions forced to fight each other by threatening their loved ones, he meets and befriends Schofield when the two men realize that they were each abducted to fight in this contest. Recognising that the wider meaning of the Games is important even if its current purpose is cruel, the two work together to save their hostages, with Schofield asking the game masters to spare West's life as his 'reward' for winning one round. With their actions in the Games completing half of a ritual to divert a rogue galaxy from the Milky Way, West is apparently forced to kill Schofield in a later stage, but Schofield is revealed to have faked his death using hyper-oxygenated blood, joining forces with West to find three lost cities that will allow them to prevent an upcoming 'Omega Event' (The apparent destruction of the universe).

Relationships with other characters

Elizabeth 'Fox' Gant 
Schofield's primary love interest, Gant was one of the original members of his reconnaissance team sent to Wilkes. She got married when she was 19 and became pregnant by 20, only to learn that her husband was cheating on her and she had a miscarriage. Deciding to use her newfound hatred for men by becoming a soldier, Gant joined the USMC and met Shane Schofield at Pearl Harbour, and immediately became attracted to him. In Ice Station she holds the rank of Lance-Corporal, in Area 7 it is Staff Sergeant, and in Scarecrow she is a First Lieutenant. She has a sister named Denise.

In Ice Station, Gant is with the first team to arrive at the station, and is mocked by Hollywood over her somewhat obvious affection for Schofield. She is knocked out at the beginning of the scuffle with the French by one of their crossbows, but recovers and kills Cuvier toward the battle's end. While preparing diving equipment to reach the ice cavern with the spacecraft, Gant admitted her attraction for Schofield to Book, but she added she didn't want to admit the feelings to Schofield himself, preferring to be close and unable to touch him than be further away and still not touch him. Along with Montana, Santa Cruz and Sarah Hensleigh, Gant is part of the team that ventures down to the cavern. While they are down there and the others are working on opening the craft, Gant discovers that there was once another ice station, which was building an unauthorised stealth fighter during the 1960s. After witnessing Montana kill Santa Cruz, as he is part of the ICG, she is wounded by him, but is inadvertently saved by a mutated elephant seal. When Schofield and his group arrives, Gant then kills Hensleigh, also a member of the ICG. After being taken to the Wasp aircraft carrier by Schofield, Gant is transferred to a military hospital in Pearl Harbour, where she awakens to discover Schofield hasn't left her side.

In the beginning of Area 7, Gant and Schofield are revealed to have gone out on a date, which ended awkwardly when Schofield failed to kiss her before he left, and she ignores the advances of Nicholas Tate, who tries to win her over having bought her expensive jewellery for her birthday. During the battle against the forces at Area 7, Gant and her team are separated from Schofield when they try to escape on the X-rail. While awaiting their return, Gant comes up with a plan to mimic the signal transmitting from the President by modifying an AWACS plane's black box. After surviving the battle arranged by prisoners freed during the story, Gant sets out to find the control for the transmitter on the President's heart, but is captured by Lucifer Leary, the only remaining prisoner. After waking up, she manages to contact Schofield, who comes to rescue her and kill Lucifer, also kissing her. Learning Caesar also has a heart transmitter, Gant manages to stop it transmitting and replace the signal from her black box, allowing Schofield to kill Caesar. Later, after being awarded medals for saving the President's life, Gant and Schofield go out on another date.

By Scarecrow, Gant and Schofield have been dating for a while, and, by recommendation from the President, has been promoted to First Lieutenant and Reconnaissance Unit commander. Leading a team of Marines in an allied mission to end Al-Qaeda, it all goes wrong when two groups of bounty hunters arrive to kill two of their targets and two of their British allies, and Gant is captured by Damon 'Demon' Larkham and his IG-88 troops, who intend to use her to get to Schofield. While en route to France on a plane, she is rescued by Schofield, and accompanies him and Knight to a castle, the Forteresse de Valois, in France to find out what the bounty hunt is for. However they are identified, and while trying to escape Gant is shot by a fighter jet and captured with Knight. Gant is viciously beheaded via a guillotine in Jonathon Killian's castle by Cal Noonan. Before she dies she pleads for Knight to tell Schofield she would have said yes to his planned proposal. Her execution drives Schofield to attempt suicide, but Mother convinces him not to, prompting him to seek vengeance. Gant was avenged when Schofield beheaded Noonan in the same way he killed her.

Gena 'Mother' Newman 
A member of Schofield's team, and one of the original members of the Wilkes ice station incident. After losing one of her legs to a killer whale, Mother had it replaced with a titanium prosthetic. She has a husband named Ralph, who is a trucker. She has become known for surviving seemingly impossible situations, with the text noting that, if the Grim Reaper exists, Mother is the only person he is frightened of. Mother's callsign is not meant to convey maternal qualities - rather it is short for Motherf*cker

In Ice Station, Mother is part of Book's team, and arrives at the Wiles ice station to help fight against the French Paratroopers. However while in the central shaft she, Rebound and Legs fall into the diving pool, where they are attacked by killer whales. She kills the whale she loses her leg to, and is forced to wait out the rest of the battle while she is still in shock. After being given some pain relief, she reassures Schofield on their victory despite being on the back foot, and mentions that many recruits tell stories about infiltrators from the government being placed in units after he asks if she knows anything. Scott 'Snake' Kaplan, a member of the Intelligence Convergence Group which she mentioned to Schofield earlier, attempts to kill her in her weakened state, but Mother is able to overpower him. After learning that a team of British SAS soldiers are coming, Mother tells Schofield to leave her, knowing she will slow him down, and he kisses her before he goes. Mother hides underneath a dumbwaiter, and soon lapses into unconsciousness. Mother wakes up when a team of Navy SEALs intent on killing everyone arrives, and she uses diving equipment to escape into the pool, following a trail of rope to an old research station in an iceberg where she activates her GPS locator. Mother was soon rescued.

In Area 7, she returns to duty after receiving her prosthetic leg, joining Schofield and Gant's team in becoming a Marine on Marine One, and escorts the President to Area 7. Mother remains in Marine One until the base's soldiers turn on them, and she learns from a televised transmission that if the President dies then fourteen major cities will be blown up. Escaping with Schofield, Gant and Brainiac through the base, they eventually meet up with the President's team. Mother helps in retrieving the Football, but is accidentally left in Area 7 when the 7th Squadron attacks. While protecting the President, Gant tells her about her date with Schofield, and Mother isn't happy with his inability to kiss her at the end. Upon being captured by the escaped prisoners, Mother kills the turncoat Carl Webster and goes with Schofield to find Kevin in Area 8. On the way, Mother asks why Schofield didn't kiss Gant, amused by his apparent nerves. During the X-38's escape, Mother provides a distraction and is apparently killed when she crashes her vehicle. However it was a ruse which Mother faked her death to avoid being killed by Caesar, and once the crisis is over she is awarded a medal for saving the President's life.

In Scarecrow, Mother and Ralph are planning a vacation to Italy with Schofield and Gant. While in the middle of a battle between Al-Qaeda with US Marines, Gant is kidnapped by a bounty hunting group, IG-88, looking to get to Schofield. After escaping with the help of the Black Knight, Scarecrow reveals to them he is one of fifteen targets in a bounty hunt, and sends Mother and Book II to London to find a Mossad agent with information. However they are attacked by IG-88, and at one point Mother is left dangling on the edge of the building on a table. She then heads off to rendezvous with Schofield at the Forteresse de Valois, and learns from Knight about Gant's death. After saving Schofield from a French aircraft carrier, Mother desperately tries to stop Schofield from committing suicide, surprising him by using his actual name- stating that she had never used it before as she considers him to be more than just a "Shane"- and convincing him to continue with his mission. While covering Schofield as he disarms a CincLock-VII security system, Mother sacrifices herself to distract enemy forces. But once again Mother survives, and tracks Knight to the Forteresse de Valois, arriving in time to prevent Schofield from being beheaded, and helps to kill the ExSol and rogue Delta forces. Later she and Ralph hold a barbecue, still worried about Schofield.

Mother also appears in Hell Island, being part of Schofield's team in searching an apparently abandoned research facility, and in Scarecrow and the Army of Thieves, where she assists his in-training marines in defeating a major threat to Russia and Europe while also dealing with her own issues about the fragile state of her marriage due to her loyalty to Schofield. She is the only character other than Schofield to appear in every novel.

Buck 'Book' Riley, Senior
One of Schofield's Marines, he was part of the reconnaissance team sent to Wilkes. Book was originally a Marine working out of the USMC Wasp aircraft carrier, and was one day sent into Bosnia under Jack Walsh's orders to retrieve Shane Schofield, whose Harrier had been shot down. The mission was somewhat successful, and after Schofield had recovered he joined the Marine's ground forces, and became friends with Book.

In Ice Station, Book is in charge of the Marine's second hovercraft, and his team investigates a hovercraft that goes missing from their radar, only to discover the civilians inside had been shot dead. Upon arriving at the station itself, Book was caught in the fight against the French, and his helmet's earpiece was damaged, which meant he was unaware of the fight in the central shaft when he was moving civilians. He attempted to keep a young girl, Kirsty Hensleigh, from falling into the killer whale infested pool, but also fell in. Afterwards, he helped Gant prepare diving equipment so that they could find out what was in the cavern below them, and explained Schofield's story to her, and respected her prioritising her job before her feelings for Schofield. While trying to escape the SAS forces heading for the station, Kirsty Hensleigh falls from the hovercraft, and Book takes the brunt of the fall, but both are captured. Taken back to the station, Trevor Barnaby demanded to know if Schofield had men in the cavern, threatening to kill him, but Book refused the talk. But after Snake said he was lying, Barnaby had Book hung over the diving pool and lowered in with a pod of killer whales. Book tried to escape, but was ultimately killed.

In Area 7, Book's son reveals to Schofield that following his death, Book's wife Paula was moved off the Marine base they lived on and later committed suicide because she couldn't live without him. Book II mentioned that Book loved Schofield like he was another son and thought Schofield was the best commander he had served under.

Buck 'Book II' Riley, Junior
The son of Buck Riley Senior, and a member of Schofield's team of Marines as of the second book.

In his first appearance in Area 7, Book II is part of the Marines stationed aboard Marine One, escorting the President to the Air Force base. It is clear he suspects why his father died and acts coldly to Schofield. After the 7th Squadron attacks, Book II, Elvis, Love Machine and Calvin escape into a flooding elevator shaft and meet up the President's protective detail and, later, Schofield's team. After escaping the base with Schofield, they attempt to rescue Kevin, but their chopper crashes into the lake. While making their way back to Area 7, Schofield asks why Book II doesn't like him, who in turn demands to know how his father died. After Schofield tells him, Book II begins to respect him. After avoiding being captured by the base's prisoners, he later saves Agent Janson by killing one of the surviving prisoners, Goliath, who is in possession of the Football using his Maghook, but is shot in the arm in the process. Once the crisis is over, Book II is awarded a medal for saving the President's life.

In Scarecrow, Book II is part of Schofield's team as part of a mission to an abandoned Soviet missile silo, which turns out to be a trap in order to kill Schofield. Book II is the only other survivor of the incident, and after reuniting with Mother they are rescued by the Black Knight, and Schofield sends Book II and Mother to London to find a Mossad agent with information. However they are attacked by a bounty hunting team called IG-88, and while their target is killed, they manage to collect a tape with information. After the President tells Book II he has access to all of the U.S.'s resources to keep Schofield alive, Book II watches the tape and learn that M-12, the twelve richest men in the world and the ones behind the bounty, plan to start a new Cold War. Book II heads to New York to create an uplink for Schofield so that he can disarm the CincLock-VII security system M-12 is using to launch the Chameleon missiles, and his team defeats the enemy forces there. He later appears at Mother's barbecue, explaining his version of events to her and Fairfax. He does not appear in "Scarecrow and the Army of Thieves".

Andrew 'Hawk' Trent
A fellow Marine and friend of Shane Schofield. Before the main events of Ice Station, Trent was the leader of a team of Atlantic-based reconnaissance Marines.

Trent and his team was called upon to guard a group of university researchers who had apparently discovered alien technology in a Peruvian temple. However, after securing the site a Navy SEALs team arrived, apparently to help, only to be turned upon and forced to hide as the Seals and some of his own team turned on the rest. Trent called for help on a Marine commander frequency, however Schofield wasn't permitted to enter. Eventually the search for him was given up, and Trent made his way back to America, only to find that people were waiting for him. Discovering they were part of a secret government group called the Intelligence Convergence Group (ICG), Trent tortured for information from one of their men before killing him and then hid in New Mexico, posing as a gunsmith.

Noting the formidable work of Pete and Alison Cameron of the Washington Post, Trent called Pete to say he had information he might like to see, on the condition he come to him. When he arrived, Trent informed him of what had befallen him in Peru and what he had learned of the ICG, and offered evidence he had gathered during his hiding as proof of his story, including a list of ICG agents. After learning that Schofield was being targeted by the ICG, Trent sent him a warning message and went to Pearl Harbour with the Camerons, arriving in time to save Schofield's life. The two men underwent interviews for Pete and Alison's story exposing the ICG.

Trent reappears in Scarecrow, having been given his old position back leading Recon Marines. Under the President's orders, Trent escorts David Fairfax to San Francisco, so that Schofield could disarm the CincLock-VII security system remotely in order to prevent Chameleon missiles from being used to start a new Cold War. Trent leads his men onto the disguised ship and helps protect Fairfax from the Eritrean Army forces opposing them.

David Fairfax
A cryptanalyst working for the Defense Intelligence Agency's Space Division and later the Cypher and Cryptanalyst Department in the Pentagon. Fairfax managed to crack a supposedly unbreakable code known as PGP during his time at the DIA, and lives under the maxim of 'no code is unbreakable.'

In Area 7, Fairfax is deciphering several tapped phone calls from inside Area 7. He soon decodes the messages, most of which relates to the South African Reconnaissance Commandos who are talking about extracting a vaccine from the Air Force base. However, because the remaining messages are unrelated, he digs deeper and realises that there is a rogue 7th Squadron unit, Echo, which also intends to take the vaccine to a bio-weapons facility in China. After explaining the situation to his superiors, Fairfax then learns that Echo Unit intends to be extracted by escaping in an X-38 to a Chinese space shuttle. While scanning for transmissions out of Areas 7 and 8, Fairfax interrupts Nicholas Tate's cell phone call and speaks with Schofield and the President, warning them about the rogue Echo Unit's plans. Fairfax soon supplies Schofield the codes preventing Area 7's self-destruct sequence, and is presented a medal of bravery by the President.

In Scarecrow, Schofield calls Fairfax asking him to look into things surrounding a bounty on his head, including Knight's history. Schofield sends him to locate Thompson Oliphant, a former USAMRMC scientist on the bounty list, and is berated by his superior for insubordination before he leaves. As he arrives, another bounty hunter called the Zulu appears and attacks Oliphant, and Fairfax attempts to escape with Oliphant in an ambulance. However the Zulu keeps up with them, and Fairfax manages to kill the Zulu by releasing the ambulance's gurney so that he fell to the ground beneath the teetering vehicle. Oliphant begins explaining that he was being targeted for his work on the CincLock-VII security system before he is killed by another bounty hunter, the Ice Queen. However she is intrigued by Fairfax's loyalty when she learns that he killed the Zulu to find information to help his friend rather than to protect Oliphant as a person, so she decides to let him live, although notes that she would kill Fairfax if they ran into each other while he was protecting his friend again. After returning to the Pentagon, Fairfax is threatened to be fired by Hogg, but is collected by Andrew Trent, who has orders to take him to San Francisco to provide Schofield with a satellite up-link so that he can disarm the CincLock-VII guarding a Chameleon missile, Fairfax being one of the few people Schofield trusts to do the job despite his lack of field experience. Fairfax manages to do so, and later shares his stories with Mother and Book II at a barbecue.

Aloysius Knight 
A former Delta soldier-turned bounty hunter. He has been described by some as being somewhat of a Shane Schofield gone wrong, possessing skills and reputation similar to Schofield while using his abilities independently; like Schofield, he regularly wears specially tinted glasses due to ocular damage, although in his case the glasses are amber-tinted anti-flash glasses due to an eye condition which makes his retinas too sensitive to natural light, rather than Schofield's being the result of torture.

Sometime before Ice Station took place, Knight often performed solo missions for Delta, and was married and had a young baby. However while staking out an Al-Qaeda base, he called for backup due to Osama Bin Laden's presence, but the squadron, led by Wade Brandeis, turned on him under orders from the ICG. Knight and Rufus avoided being killed, killing nine men before Brandeis blew up the lighthouse they were in, and hid in a storm cellar as it collapsed. ICG claimed Knight had been accepting money from Al-Qaeda, and was placed on the Department of Defense's Most Wanted list. With his wife and child now dead due to being killed by ICG, Knight went underground and became a bounty hunter, and vowed to get revenge on Brandeis. One of his ventures as a bounty hunter had him rescue the daughter of a Russian deputy President from Islamic hostage takers without the media knowing, and was rewarded with a Sukhoi S-37 called the Black Raven, and refueling privileges at any Russian base.

In Scarecrow, Knight is contracted by the richest woman in the world, Lillian Mattencourt, to protect Schofield in a bounty hunt so that he would be able to complete the tasks the bounty is intended to stop him from doing. Arriving late at Krask 8 where Schofield was ambushed, Knight ruthlessly killed a wounded ExSol man before heading to Afghanistan. He then saved Schofield's team from Major Zamanov and the Skorpions, before heading out with Schofield to rescue Gant from the Demon. They then go to the Forteresse de Valois to find out more, but Schofield is identified, and in the ensuing chase Knight and Gant are captured. Witnessing her beheading, Knight uses his various tools to escape and rendezvous with Rufus and Mother. Once Schofield has disarmed the CincLock-VII security systems, Knight goes with him to stop another missile from hitting Mecca, and is forced to pilot his own X-15 and drives it into the path of another missile about to hit Schofield and Rufus. In the aftermath they are captured by Brandeis and his team and taken to Killian's castle, and Mother arrives to rescue them. As they fight back, Knight gets his revenge of Brandeis by moving him into the path of an attacking shark. After killing Delecrois he saves Schofield when he takes Killian out the window using a Maghook. Later Demon kills Mattencourt, preventing Knight from receiving his commission as revenge for stealing the Demon's bounties earlier. He sends a card to Schofield telling him that he has earned Knight's trust- noting that Schofield impressed him so much that he went beyond the terms of his contract, given that he saved Schofield during his attempt to kill Killian even though the terms of the original contract had expired- and will be there if he is asked for help.

Veronique 'Renard' Champion 
Veronique Champion is an assassin working for the French Directorate-General for External Security with thirteen confirmed kills to her name, and the cousin of Luc Champion, a deceased French researcher from the Wilkes Ice Station incident.

Before becoming an assassin, Champion was a field agent for the DGSE, working with local assets in the Middle East. One of her agents, Hannah, discovered a plot against French interests, and asked to be brought in to protect her family and unborn child. Once inside DGSE headquarters, Hannah detonated a bomb surgically implanted in her uterus with a false fetus designed to fool the metal detectors. The explosion killed several high-ranking DGSE members, including Champion's husband. Champion blamed herself for failing to realise that Hannah had used her to gain access to the DGSE building.

While the French government declared Schofield an enemy of France for his acts against them, Champion held Schofield accountable for the death of her cousin. Asking to personally follow up his bounty, she and her unit stalk Schofield in the Arctic. While preparing to attack Schofield, they themselves are attacked by the Army of Thieves, and Schofield rescues Champion and two of her men in the hopes of having their help fighting the Army. Upon learning Schofield was not responsible for Luc's death, Champion agrees, but says that once they are finished she will try and assassinate him anyway. Champion is seriously wounded helping to disarm the facility's red uranium supply, and she and Scofield are separated from the rest of the team. Champion and Schofield begin to trust one another and bond over the loss of their loved ones. Champion remains in a whaling village, and gives an AI drone (Bertie) equipment to help him fight back against the Army. When the Army's threat is extinguished, a Russian nuclear missile is launched at Dragon Island, and Schofield rescues Champion and gets her to a hidden nuclear bunker just before the missile hits. For his actions in saving French lives during the incident, Champion appeals to the French government, who rescind the bounty on his head. She and Schofield begin a relationship shortly afterwards, and Schofield learns that her callsign – Renard – is French for "Fox", believed to be a link and homage to Elizabeth 'Fox' Gant.

Marius Calderon
Marius Calderon is a CIA operative gifted with extraordinary foresight, and an expert in psychological warfare. He is the primary antagonist of Scarecrow and the Army of Thieves.

Most of Calderon's history prior to the events of the story is unknown. He was a "rising star" of the CIA, and served in almost all of their operational divisions at one point or another during his thirty-year career, spending the most time in their psychological warfare division. In 1982, he authored a paper predicting the rise of China as a global superpower by the year 2010, one that would threaten the United States' position as the world's strongest economy; in 1984, he conceived Operation 'Dragonslayer' to directly counter this perceived threat. Calderon arranged for plans to a superweapon that could ignite the earth's atmosphere to be "stolen" by the Russians, planting false data to suggest that the weapon would decimate the United States when in reality, it would destroy China and Europe. Thirty years later, he assembled the titular Army of Thieves from African militants and South American guerillas, and took control of Dragon Island, the site of the Russian-built weapons.

Reilly has described Calderon as being a product of Schofield's state of mind. With the death of Elizabeth Gant in the events of Scarecrow, Reilly said that he needed to create a villain who represented a genuine threat to Schofield, and settled on an expert in psychological warfare to exploit Schofield's fractured emotional state. Calderon claims to have "forgotten more about torture than [most] will ever know", and believes that the only effective way to encourage his victims to talk is to torture someone they care about in front of them. He further claims that this tactic has led to the prevention of six terrorist attacks "on the same scale of September Eleven". Calderon uses psychological indoctrination to command absolute loyalty among his followers and takes extreme measures to protect his identity, using the name "Lord of Anarchy and General of the Army of Thieves", and undergoing plastic surgery.

After Schofield prevents Calderon's plans for igniting a firestorm that would devastate the Northern Hemisphere, Calderon is seen escaping in a miniature submarine. According to the CIA, Calderon was found, dead, by a Norwegian fishing trawler, when the submarine was disabled by a nuclear explosion and Calderon suffocated after being trapped on the bottom of the Arctic Ocean. However, in the novel's epilogue, Schofield finds evidence that Calderon survived. While describing his creation, Reilly stated that he had always intended for Calderon to survive, and to return in future novels, similar to Professor Moriarty and Ernst Stavro Blofeld.

References

Literary characters introduced in 1998
Fictional United States Marine Corps personnel
Fictional Medal of Honor recipients
Fictional Yugoslav War veterans
Novels by series
Novel series